The men's triathlon was part of the Triathlon at the 2008 Summer Olympics programme. It was the third appearance of the event, which was established in 2000. The competition was held on Tuesday, August 19, 2008 at the Triathlon Venue at the Ming Tomb Reservoir in Shisanling. Fifty-five triathletes from 31 nations competed.

The men's triathlon was won by Jan Frodeno of Germany with a time of 1:48:53.28. Simon Whitfield of Canada, who previously won this event in 2000, claimed the silver, while New Zealand's Bevan Docherty, silver medalist at the 2004 Athens, took the bronze. For the first time in Olympic history, two athletes had won more than a single medal in triathlon.

Competition format
The race was held over the "international distance" (also called "Olympic distance") and consisted of  swimming, road cycling, and  road running.

Results

* Including Transition 1 (swimming-to-cycling) and T2 (cycling-to-running), roughly a minute. 
No one is allotted the number 13.
LAP – Lapped by the leader on the cycling course.

References

BAUMAN, J. (2016) Energy conservation and management for high performance. Available at: http://usaswimming.org/ViewNewsArticle.aspx?TabId=0&Alias=Rainbow&Lang=en&ItemId=13432&mid=11997 (Accessed: 17 March 2016).
ITU. ( 2016) International Triathlon Union. Available at: http://www.triathlon.org/olympics/ (Accessed: 17 March 2016).
Carlson, Timothy. (2012) The intricacies of Olympic qualification. Available at: http://www.slowtwitch.com/Interview/The_intricacies_of_Olympic_qualification_2731.html

External links
NBC Olympics – Triathlon

Triathlon at the 2008 Summer Olympics
Olympics
Men's events at the 2008 Summer Olympics